Artem Iossafov (born September 27, 1990) is a Russian-born Finnish ice hockey player.

Playing career
Iossafov began his career in Finland and made his Liiga debut playing with HIFK during the 2013–14 Liiga season.

Career statistics

References

External links

1990 births
Living people
Asplöven HC players
Dunaújvárosi Acélbikák players
Espoo Blues players
Finnish ice hockey left wingers
Gentofte Stars players
HIFK (ice hockey) players
JKH GKS Jastrzębie players
KalPa players
Kiekko-Vantaa players
Podhale Nowy Targ players
Russian ice hockey left wingers
Russian emigrants to Finland
Sportspeople from Tver